Monoenergism was a notion in early medieval Christian theology, representing the belief that Christ had only one "energy" (energeia). The teaching of one energy was propagated during the first half of the seventh century by Patriarch Sergius I of Constantinople. Opposition to dyoenergism, its counterpart, would persist until Dyoenergism was espoused as Orthodoxy at the Sixth Ecumenical Council and monoenergism was rejected as heresy.

After the failure of Emperor Justinian I and the Second Council of Constantinople to mend the Chalcedonian schism and unify main Christian communities within the Byzantine Empire by a single Christology, similar efforts were renewed by Heraclius (610–641), who attempted to solve the schism between the dyophysite Eastern Orthodox Apostolic and Catholic Chalcedonian party and the miaphysite  Oriental Orthodoxy non-Chalcedonian party, suggesting the compromise of monoenergism. 

This compromise adopted the Chalcedonian dyophysite belief that Christ the Incarnate Logos of God is of and in two natures, but tried to address non-Chalcedonian miaphysite misgivings by the view that Christ had one "energy" (energeia), a term whose definition was left deliberately vague. Monoenergism was accepted by the Patriarchs of Constantinople, Antioch, and Alexandria, as well as by the Armenians and was not clearly criticized by Pope Honorius I of Rome in his 635 epistle. However, it was rejected by Athanasius I Gammolo and the strong opposition of Patriarch Sophronius of Jerusalem won wide support. This led Heraclius to abandon the teaching in 638 (though still condemning dyoenergism) and to attempt to enforce instead the doctrine of monothelitism, opposed most notably by Maximus the Confessor. This too failed to heal the schism and theologically unite the empire.

Both monoenergism as well as monotheletism were condemned as heresies by the Sixth Ecumenical Council, held in Constantinople in 680–681.

See also 

 Essence–energies distinction
 Miaphysitism
 Monergism
 Monothelitism

References

Sources

Further reading 

 

7th-century Christianity
Christian terminology
Christianity in the Byzantine Empire
Christianity in the Middle East
Christology
Eastern Orthodox theology
Heresy in Christianity in the Middle Ages
Oriental Orthodox theology

Nature of Jesus Christ